Little Ashes is a 2008 Spanish-British drama film set against the backdrop of Spain during the 1920s and 1930s, as three of the era's most creative young talents meet at university and set off on a course to change their world. Luis Buñuel watches helplessly as the friendship between surrealist painter Salvador Dalí and the poet Federico García Lorca develops into a love affair.

Little Ashes won the GLAAD Media Award for "Outstanding Film−Limited Release" during the 21st GLAAD Media Awards.

Plot
In 1922, 18-year-old Salvador Dalí (Robert Pattinson) arrives at art school in Madrid. The Residencia de Estudiantes, or Students' Residence, is a modern environment which encourages Spain's brightest young minds. Salvador, who is determined to become a great artist, soon catches the attention of the Resi'''s social elite — poet Federico García Lorca (Javier Beltrán) and aspiring filmmaker Luis Buñuel (Matthew McNulty). Together, they form the nucleus of the most modern artist group in Madrid.

Their private lives become increasingly complex, as Federico ignores the advances of devoted friend and writer Magdalena (Marina Gatell), and Salvador himself feels the pull of Federico's magnetism. Luis, becoming increasingly isolated by the duo's closeness, decides to move to Paris to fulfill his own artistic ambitions. Meanwhile, Salvador and Federico leave Madrid to spend the summer at the seaside village of Cadaques, at the home of Dalí's family.

Federico finds himself accepted into the Dalí family as he and Salvador grow closer until, one night, their friendship becomes romantic. Even as they draw closer, their relationship appears doomed. Luis visits them at university and becomes more suspicious and appalled by their apparent intimacy.

Salvador finds Federico's obsession more than he is prepared to handle, and eventually leaves for Paris. Enveloped by the high society and decadence there, Salvador is soon entangled with Gala (Arly Jover), a married woman with a penchant for celebrities. When Federico visits, he finds his friend is a changed man, both in his life and his politics.

Background
Details of the relationship between artist Salvador Dalí and poet Federico García Lorca have long been the subject of speculation and debate among historians and biographers. In Little Ashes, Dalí's and Lorca's feelings are shown deepening into a love affair that the sexually repressed painter tries (but fails) to consummate.

Between 1925 and 1936, during the course of their friendship, Dalí and Lorca exchanged numerous letters. The original manuscripts of Dalí's letters to Lorca are held by the Fundación Federico García Lorca in Madrid, and those of Lorca to Dalí are held by Fundacion Gala-Salvador Dalí in Pubol, as well as in private collections. While it is widely acknowledged that Lorca was infatuated with Dalí, for years the painter denied entering into a relationship with Lorca.

Dalí stated: 

The film's writer Philippa Goslett supposes:

Biographer of both Dalí and Lorca, Ian Gibson, stated: 

In the repressed Spain of the mid 1930s, Lorca's homosexuality seems to have provided an additional thrill to those who assassinated him in 1936. Lorca's biographer Leslie Stainton has suggested that the killers made remarks about his sexual orientation

Cast
 Robert Pattinson as Salvador Dalí
 Javier Beltrán as Federico García Lorca
 Matthew McNulty as Luis Buñuel
 Marina Gatell as Magdalena
 Bruno Oro as Paco
 Esther Nubiola as Adela
 Marc Pujol as Carlos
 Arly Jover as Gala Dalí
 Simón Andreu as Fernando del Valle
 Vicky Peña as Magdalena's aunt
 Rubén Arroyo as Rafael
 Diana Gómez as Ana María
 Pep Sais as Art Teacher
 Joan Picó as Young Officer
 Ferran Audí as Guard 1
 Adría Allué as Guard 2
 Ferran Lahoz as Señor Milagro
 Cristian Rodrigo as Young Journalist
 Sue Flack as Madam
 Adrian Devant as Puppeteer
 Ramón Enrich as Professor
 Xavi Siles as Man 1
 Philippa Goslett and Hannah Rũtzou as Federico's Sisters
 Paco Alonso as Gypsy Singer

Production

The title is taken from Salvador Dalí's 1927–28 painting Cenicitas (Little Ashes). It was originally called The Birth of Venus, before being changed to Sterile Efforts and then finally Cenicitas. It was first displayed on 20 March 1929 in a Madrid exhibition. It was again displayed in his first solo exhibition in Paris in June 1931. The painting is currently in the Dalí collection of the Museo Nacional Centro de Arte Reina Sofía in Madrid.

ReleaseLittle Ashes premiered at the 16th annual Raindance Film Festival in London.  The sold-out screening was scheduled on 7 October 2008 at 19:00, and a second screening was also added for 8 October at 14:30. Little Ashes premiered in the US at the Miami Gay & Lesbian film festival. On 8 May 2009 it premiered in only 11 US locations.

The UK DVD was released on 13 July 2009 and is rated 15. The US DVD was released on 26 January 2010.

Critical reception
The film holds a "Rotten" rating of 24% based on 70 reviews with an average rating of 4.2 out of 10 on the film review aggregator Rotten Tomatoes. The site's consensus states, "It has a beautiful cast, but Little Ashes suffers from an uneven tone and a surplus of unintentionally silly moments."

Ty Burr of the Boston Globe panned the film and wrote: "What's intended to be a daring look at repressed sexuality, three-ways and all, has the dramatic heft of a true-love comic book".

Greg Quill of the Toronto Star wrote: "Even cinematographer Adam Suschitzky's richly textured and resonantly toned cityscapes and rural scenes can't make up for a flawed script and weak performances in what might have been a powerful historical drama".

Chris Hewitt of the St. Paul Pioneer Press commented that: "The movie, with its badly painted backdrops, its stiff acting and its complete lack of dramatic momentum, is embarrassing to watch".

However, Steven Rea of the Philadelphia Inquirer gave the film a positive review by calling it: "A bravely earnest and gauzy bit of biography".

References

Further reading
 "Were Spain's Two Artistic Legends Secret Gay Lovers?", The Guardian (28 October 2007)
 Aria film synopsis
 George E. Haggerty, Gay Histories and Cultures 
 Ian Gibson, The Shameful Life of Salvador Dalí 
 Salvador Dalí: An Illustrated Life'', Tate Publishing

External links
 
 
 

2008 films
2008 biographical drama films
Biographical films about artists
Biographical films about painters
Biographical films about poets
Male bisexuality in film
British biographical drama films
British LGBT-related films
2000s English-language films
Films shot in Barcelona
British independent films
Cultural depictions of Salvador Dalí
Cultural depictions of Federico García Lorca
Cultural depictions of Luis Buñuel
Spanish independent films
English-language Spanish films
Gay-related films
2008 drama films
Films directed by Paul Morrison (director)
2000s British films